Oedaleosia frontalis is a moth of the  subfamily Arctiinae. It was described by Strand in 1909. It is found in eastern Africa.

References

Lithosiini
Moths described in 1909